State Highway 3 (SH 3) is a state highway in Jharkhand, India.

Route 
SH 3 originates from its junction with National Highway 143 and State Highway 4 at Kolebira and passes through Basia, Kamdara, Torpa, Khunti and terminates at its junction with National Highway 43 at Tamar. 

The total length of SH 3 is 109 km.

References 
 

State Highways in Jharkhand